Gail Mathurin (born 1960) is a Jamaican ambassador.

From 1998 to 2002 she was Senior Director, Foreign Trade Department, Ministry of Foreign Affairs and Foreign Trade.
From 2002 to 2005 she was Under-Secretary, Foreign Trade Division, Ambassador for External Negotiations, Ministry of Foreign Affairs and Foreign Trade, Non-resident Ambassador to Argentina, Brazil and Uruguay.
From  to  she was High Commissioner in London.
 and Non-resident Ambassador to Denmark, Finland, Norway and Spain.
From 2006 to  she was Permanent Representative to the United Nations Office at Geneva and Permanent Representative to the World Trade Organization.
From  to  she was Permanent Representative to the United Nations Office at Vienna.

References 

Living people
Place of birth missing (living people)
1960 births
Jamaican women ambassadors
High Commissioners of Jamaica to the United Kingdom
Ambassadors of Jamaica to Denmark
Ambassadors of Jamaica to Finland
Ambassadors of Jamaica to Norway
Ambassadors of Jamaica to Spain